The 1998 World Jiu-Jitsu Championship, commonly known as the 1998 Mundials or Worlds, was an international jiu-jitsu event organised by the International Brazilian Jiu-Jitsu Federation (IBJFF) and held at the Tijuca Tênis Clube in Rio de Janeiro, Brazil on 1 April 1998.

Teams results 
Results by Academy

References 

World Jiu-Jitsu Championship